Stictochironomus is a genus of non-biting midges in the subfamily Chironominae of the bloodworm family Chironomidae. Members of this genus often have strongly marked wings and legs. The larvae of these midges may also have distinct dark patterns on the dorsal side of the head capsule. They live in sand and other sediments in a variety of fresh water habitats  in densities of several hundred per square meter. 

S. maculipennis larvae have been reported to live relatively deep, up to 6 cm, in the sediment to avoid predation. It has been suggested they migrate between the deeper sediment layers and the sediment surface to breathe.

Species
S. albicrus (Townes, 1945)
S. annulicrus (Townes, 1945)
S. crassiforceps (Kieffer, 1922)
S. devinctus (Say, 1829)
S. flavicingulus (Walker, 1848)
S. han (Na & Bae, 2010)
S. lutosus (Townes, 1945)
S. maculipennis (Meigen, 1818)
S. marmoreus (Townes, 1945)
S. naevus (Mitchell, 1908)
S. palliatus (Coquillett, 1902)
S. pictulus (Meigen, 1830)
S. quagga (Townes, 1945)
S. rosenschoeldi (Zetterstedt, 1838)
S. sticticus (Fabricius, 1781)
S. unguiculatus (Malloch, 1934)
S. varius (Townes, 1945)
S. virgatus (Townes, 1945)

References

Chironomidae
Diptera of Europe